Zhu Shouqian (1361–1392), the Prince of Jingjiang, was the grandnephew of Zhu Yuanzhang (the Hongwu Emperor). His grandfather, Zhu Xinglong, Prince of Nanchang, was the eldest brother of the Hongwu Emperor, and his father was Zhu Wenzheng.

Biography

Childhood
Zhu Shouqian was born Zhu Tiezhu. Zhu Shouqian's father, Zhu Wenzheng, was stripped of his rank and imprisoned on charges of conspiring against Zhu Yuanzhang when Zhu Shouqian was only 4 years old; however, Zhu Yuanzhang personally reassured him, saying: "You have nothing to fear. Your father was unruly and gave me trouble, but I will not punish you for his misdeeds."

His name was changed to "Wei" when Zhu Yuanzhang claimed the title "King of Wu". In 1370, the third year of the Hongwu reign, he was then renamed Shouqian and enfeoffed as the Prince of Jingjiang — the only feudal prince who was not a child of Zhu Yuanzhang.

Enfeoffed as a vassal prince
Zhu Shouqian was awarded the status of a prince under the title "Prince of Jingjiang" by the Hongwu Emperor when he was 9 years old. He took his fief, Jingjiang (present-day Guilin), in 1376. His salary was the same as that of a second rank commandery prince, but his rank was half that of a first rank prince.

Jingjiang has Toghon Temür's potential residence, which was changed to a palace, and Shouqian expressed his gratitude. The Hongwu Emperor said to the ministers who followed: "Zhu Shouqian is young and guards the southwest, and he must be well counseled."

Demoted twice and imprisoned
Zhu Shouqian was an educated person, but he often allied with villains and made the locals dissatisfied with him. The Hongwu Emperor summoned him in 1370 to reprimand him. After that, Zhu wrote a poem with some complaints and made the emperor angry. As a result, the emperor demoted him to a commoner.

He was imprisoned in Fengyang for seven years until the Hongwu Emperor restored his title. The emperor ordered him to go defend Yunnan with his brother-in-law, Xu Pu. The emperor granted him an encyclical book, but Zhu still acted violently. Later, the emperor summoned him to Fengyang where Zhu stole horses; he was caught and imprisoned again.

Death and aftermath
Zhu Shouqian died in January 1392. His burial place is located on Purple Mountain. His son, Zhu Zanyi, was young and was named the Hereditary Prince (世子).

Family
Consorts and Issue:
 Lady, of the Xu clan (徐氏)
 Zhu Zanyi, Prince Daoxi of Jingjiang (靖江悼僖王 朱贊儀; 1382–1408), first son
 Lady, of the Zhang clan (張氏)
 Zhu Zankan (朱贊侃), third son
 Lady, of the Liu clan (劉氏)
 Zhu Zanjun (朱贊俊), fourth son
 Lady, of the Zhao clan (趙氏)
 Zhu Zanxie (朱贊偕), fifth son
 Lady, of the Lin clan (林氏)
 Zhu Zanlun (朱贊倫), sixth son
 Lady, of the Xu clan (徐氏)
 Zhu Zanjie (朱贊傑), seventh son
 Lady, of the Tian clan (田氏)
 Zhu Zanchu (朱贊儲), eighth son
 Lady, of the Wang clan (王氏)
 Zhu Zanyi (朱贊億), ninth son
 Unknown
 Zhu Zanyan (朱贊儼), second son

Ancestry

References

1361 births
1392 deaths
Ming dynasty imperial princes